Opole Główne (Polish for Opole main station) is a major railway station in the southern Polish city of Opole. It also is the biggest station in Opole Voivodeship, with connections to all major Polish cities, several local towns of the area, as well as international locations, such as Berlin and Hamburg.

The first station building for Opole Główne was completed in 1853, and back then it was called Oppeln Hauptbahnhof, as the city belonged to the German Empire. However, the original building was destroyed and another one was built in around 1899. It still is in use, and in 1926  underground access to platforms was constructed, together with the second building housing the entrance hall. The station building is in the eclectic style with neo-Gothic, neo-Renaissance, secession and neo-classical elements.

The station is a crucial rail junction, as it serves several connections, including the major lines to Wrocław, Częstochowa, Kędzierzyn-Koźle, and Strzelce Opolskie. Furthermore, it serves local lines to Nysa, and Kluczbork.

Connections 
Opole Główne is directly connected with all major Polish cities, such as:
 Białystok,
 Bielsko-Biała,
 Częstochowa,
 Gliwice,
 Gorzów Wielkopolski,
 Jelenia Góra,
 Katowice,
 Kielce,
 Koszalin,
 Kraków,
 Legnica,
 Lublin,
 Poznań,
 Przemyśl,
 Rzeszów,
 Słupsk,
 Świnoujście,
 Szczecin,
 Tarnów,
 Tarnów Mościce,
 Wałbrzych,
 Warszawa,
 Wrocław,
 Zamość.

Train services
The station is served by the following service(s):

EuroCity services (EC) (EC 95 by DB) (IC by PKP) Berlin - Frankfurt (Oder) - Rzepin - Wrocław – Katowice – Kraków – Rzeszów – Przemyśl
Express Intercity Premium services (EIP) Warsaw - Wrocław
Express Intercity services (EIC) Warsaw - Wrocław 
Intercity services (IC) Warszawa  - Częstochowa - Opole - Wrocław 
Intercity services (IC) Zielona Góra - Wrocław - Opele - Częstochowa - Kraków - Rzeszów - Przemyśl
Intercity services (IC) Kraków Główny — Świnoujście
Intercity services (IC) Ustka - Koszalin - Poznań - Wrocław - Opole - Bielsko-Biała
Intercity services (IC) Bydgoszcz - Poznań - Leszno - Wrocław - Opole - Rybnik - Bielsko-Biała - Zakopane
Intercity services (TLK) Warszawa - Częstochowa - Lubliniec - Opole - Wrocław - Szklarska Poręba Górna
Regional services (PR) Opole Główne - Gliwice 
Regional services (PR) Wrocław - Oława - Brzeg - Opole Główne - Gliwice
Regional services (PR) Wrocław Główny - Oława - Brzeg - Opole Główne
Regional services (PR) Wrocław - Oława - Brzeg - Opole Główne - Kędzierzyn-Koźle
Regional services (PR) Wrocław - Oława - Brzeg - Opole Główne - Kędzierzyn-Koźle - Racibórz
Regional services (PR) Brzeg - Opole
Regional services (PR) Brzeg - Opole - Kędzierzyn-Koźle
Regional services (PR) Kluczbork - Opole
Regional services (PR) Opole - Nysa
Regional services (PR) Kluczbork - Opole - Nysa

References

External links 
 
 Historic photos of the Opole Main Station
 A photo gallery of the station
 Departures from the Opole Main Station

Railway stations in Poland opened in 1899
Eclectic architecture
Glowne
Railway stations in Opole Voivodeship
Buildings and structures in Opole
Railway stations served by Przewozy Regionalne InterRegio